Henry Kwek Hian Chuan (born 20 April 1976) is a Singaporean politician and businessman. A member of the governing People's Action Party (PAP), he has been the Member of Parliament (MP) representing Kebun Baru SMC since 2020 and previously the Kebun Baru division of Nee Soon GRC between 2015 and 2020.

Education
Kwek attended The Chinese High School and Victoria Junior College before graduating from Stanford University, where he majored in economics and management science.

Career 
Kwek is also an executive director of a Singapore-based investment, trading and management consulting company.

Political career
Kwek has spoken in Parliament about issues facing the elderly and their caregivers, and opportunities for Singapore-based companies and start-ups.

In his constituency, Kwek launched The Hope Collective, which brings together volunteers, welfare organisations and government agencies to collaborate and draw up programmes for the needy.

On 18 June 2022, Kwek attended the 14th edition of Pink Dot SG, an event held at the Speakers' Corner of Hong Lim Park since 2009 in support of the LGBT community in the country. Kwek's attendance was the first time an MP from the governing People's Action Party (PAP), has physically shown their support for the event.

References

External links
 Henry Kwek on Parliament of Singapore

1976 births
Living people
Stanford University alumni
Members of the Parliament of Singapore
People's Action Party politicians
Singaporean businesspeople
Victoria Junior College alumni